Atherigona orientalis, the tomato fly, is a species of fly in the family Muscidae.

References

Muscidae
Insect pests of millets